Eric James Nattress (born May 25, 1962) is a Canadian former National Hockey League defenceman.  He was drafted in the second round, 27th overall, by the Montreal Canadiens in the 1980 NHL Entry Draft.

Nattress played three seasons in the Ontario Hockey League with the Brantford Alexanders before making his NHL debut for Montreal in the 1982–83 season, appearing in 40 games. Nattress would appear in 34 games with the Canadiens in 1983–84, and five more the next season, before being traded to the St. Louis Blues for cash before the 1985–86 season.

Nattress played two seasons for the Blues, who traded him to the Calgary Flames after the 1986–87 season for two draft picks.  He played four-plus seasons with the Flames before being traded to the Toronto Maple Leafs in the ten-player deal on January 2, 1992, which also sent Doug Gilmour to Toronto.

After joining the Philadelphia Flyers for the 1992–93 season, Nattress retired.  In his NHL career, Nattress played in 536 games.  He recorded 29 goals and 135 assists.  He also appeared in 67 playoff games, scoring five goals and adding ten assists.  He was a member of the Sherbrooke Canadiens 1985 Calder Cup team, and Calgary Flames team which won the Stanley Cup in 1989.

Nattress has been a successful radio co-host of "Blue & White Tonight", a post-game show after every Toronto Maple Leafs game on Sportsnet 590 The Fan.

Career statistics

Regular season and playoffs

International

References

External links
 
Sportsnet 590 "Blue & White Tonight" page

1962 births
Living people
Brantford Alexanders players
Calgary Flames players
Canadian ice hockey defencemen
Canadian people of English descent
Canadian radio sportscasters
Ice hockey people from Ontario
Sportspeople from Hamilton, Ontario
London Knights coaches
Montreal Canadiens draft picks
Montreal Canadiens players
Nova Scotia Voyageurs players
Philadelphia Flyers players
St. Louis Blues players
Sherbrooke Canadiens players
Stanley Cup champions
Toronto Maple Leafs players
Canadian ice hockey coaches